Lunna or Lunno is a town in the Grodno Region of Belarus.

History
Before 1938, 60% of the 2 522 inhabitants were Jewish, around 300 families.
The town was under Soviet control in the first stage in the war, from August 1939 to June 1941 when the German army occupied the village.  At that time, the Jewish community of Lunna was around 1300, with another 400 living in Wola. From October 1941 to November 1942, Lunna and Wola Jews were confined to a ghetto where five to seven families lived in each house.  The Jews were brutalized, conscripted for slave labor, and punished severely for any infraction. Many died in the ghetto.  In November 1942, ghetto residents were transported to the Kielbasin transit camp where they lived for a month and then sent to Auschwitz. Almost all died there, most immediately.  Two, Zalman Gradowski and Josef Dereszynski, led an armed uprising against the guards in Auschwitz in October 1944, an uprising in which three other Lunna residents participated.  All died in the revolt. In all, a  few more than a dozen Jews from Lunna survived the war.

Gallery

See also
List of cities in Belarus#Hrodna Province

References

External links
ShtetLinks: LUNNA
The Restored Jewish Cemetery at Lunna, Belarus
 

Populated places in Grodno Region
Trakai Voivodeship
Grodnensky Uyezd
Białystok Voivodeship (1919–1939)
Belastok Region
Holocaust locations in Belarus